Bovill may refer to:

People
 Bovill (surname)

Places
 Bovill, Idaho, USA
 Bovill Opera House
 Hotel Bovill

See also
 Bovell
Bovril
Clan Boswell